In the mathematical theory of probability, the Heyde theorem  is the characterization theorem concerning the normal distribution (the Gaussian distribution) by the symmetry of one linear form given another. This theorem was proved by C. C. Heyde.

Formulation 
Let   be independent random variables. Let   be nonzero constants such that  for all . If the conditional distribution of the linear form  given  is symmetric then all random variables  have  normal distributions (Gaussian distributions).

References 
·	C. C. Heyde, “Characterization of the normal law by the symmetry of a certain conditional distribution,” Sankhya, Ser. A,32, No. 1, 115–118 (1970). 

·	A. M. Kagan, Yu. V. Linnik, and C. R. Rao, Characterization Problems in Mathematical Statistics, Wiley, New York (1973).

Probability theorems